Ectoedemia rufifrontella is a moth of the family Nepticulidae. It is found from the Czech Republic and Slovakia to southern France, Italy and Greece.

The wingspan is 4.3-6.4 mm. Adults are on wing in mid June. There is one generation per year.

The larvae feed on Quercus pubescens and occasionally also on Quercus petraea. They mine the leaves of their host plant. The mine consists of a corridor that is so strongly contorted that it forms a secondary blotch with brown frass. The later part of the mine is less strongly contorted. Here the frass lies dispersed or coiled, leaving a clear margin at either side. The mine is often located close to the leaf margin, and is compacted on a small surface.

External links
Fauna Europaea
bladmineerders.nl
Identity Of Two Nepticulidae Described By A. Caradja (Lepidoptera)
A Taxonomic Revision Of The Western Palaearctic Species Of The Subgenera Zimmermannia Hering And Ectoedemia Busck s.str. (Lepidoptera, Nepticulidae), With Notes On Their Phylogeny. Listed as Nepticula nigrosparsella

Nepticulidae
Moths of Europe
Moths described in 1920